The RP Photonics Encyclopedia (formerly Encyclopedia of Laser Physics and Technology) is an encyclopedia of optics and optoelectronics, laser technology, optical fibers, nonlinear optics, optical communications, imaging science, optical metrology, spectroscopy and ultrashort pulse physics. It is available online as a free resource. An earlier version of the encyclopedia appeared as a two-volume book. , the online version of the encyclopedia contains 938 articles. 

Since 2012, the encyclopedia is closely interlinked with the RP Photonics Buyer's Guide, a large directory of photonics product suppliers. For the majority of products, there is a one-to-one correspondence between an encyclopedia article and a listing of suppliers for that product. 

Other resources linked with the RP Photonics Encyclopedia are a blog named The Photonics Spotlight, a glossary of photonics terms and acronyms, various tutorials, and a photonics quiz.

The author is Dr. Rüdiger Paschotta, founder and managing director of RP Photonics Consulting GmbH in Bad Dürrheim, Germany.

References

External links
 RP Photonics Encyclopedia

Encyclopedias of science
German online encyclopedias
Laser science